Sangeetha (born 21 October 1978) is an Indian actress, dancer, and television presenter who predominantly appears in Tamil, Telugu and Malayalam films. She is known as Rasika in Malayalam movie industry. Making her acting debut in the mid-1990s, Sangeetha is best known for her performances in the films Khadgam (2002), Pithamagan (2003), Uyir (2006), Dhanam (2008) and Sarileru Neekevvaru (2020).

Early life
Sangeetha was born in Chennai, India, to Santharam and Bhanumathy. Her grandfather, K. R. Balan, is a film producer, who had produced more than 20 Tamil films. Also her father had produced several films. She has two brothers. She studied at St. John's English School and Junior College, Besant Nagar, Chennai.
Sangeetha is a Bharatanatyam dancer as she had learned Bharatanatyam during her school days.

Career
She started her acting career in the late 1990s, beginning in an unreleased film opposite Venkat Prabhu titled Poonjolai. Her debut release was the big-budget Malayalam political thriller, Gangotri (1997). She subsequently played small roles in successful films like Summer in Bethlehem (1998) and Kaadhale Nimmadhi (1998). She was cast as a second heroine in the Mammootty-starrer Ezhupunna Tharakan (1999) and Dileep starrer Deepasthambham Mahaashcharyam (1999). She also earned a small role in the Mohanlal-starrer Sradha (2000). Her supporting roles in Khadgam (2002) and Pithamagan (2003) earned her Filmfare Awards in Telugu and Tamil. She then debuted in Kannada films alongside of Dr. Vishnuvardhan in Janani janmabhumi (1997) and later acted alongside Sudeep in Nalla (2004).

Television 
She was a judge on Vijay TV's hit show Jodi No.1. She was one of the three judges along with Silambarasan and Sundaram in Jodi No.1 Season Two and with S.J.Suryaah and Sundaram in Jodi No.1 and with Jeeva  and Aishwarya Dhanush in Jodi No.1 Season Three.

She was a guest judge during the finals of Vasantham Central's Indian dance competition "Dhool" held in Singapore in 2008.
She was the anchor of Enga Veetu Mapillai show in Colors Tamil.
And also she is a guest jude in Dhee and Jabardasth and she is hosted Bindaas game show for few episodes in Zee telugu

Personal life
She married film playback singer Krish in 2009 at the Arunachaleshwarar Temple in Tiruvannamalai. The couple has a daughter.

Filmography

Television
 Dance Jodi Dance (2022)
 Super Jodi (2023)

References

External links
 
 

Indian film actresses
Living people
Actresses in Malayalam cinema
Actresses in Tamil cinema
Actresses in Kannada cinema
Filmfare Awards South winners
Female models from Chennai
Tamil Nadu State Film Awards winners
Actresses from Chennai
21st-century Indian actresses
Actresses in Telugu cinema
1978 births
CineMAA Awards winners